The plateau striped whiptail (Aspidoscelis velox) is a species of teiid lizard found in Utah, Colorado, Arizona, and New Mexico in the United States. It has been introduced to the State of Oregon

References

Aspidoscelis
Reptiles described in 1928
Taxa named by Stewart Springer
Reptiles of the United States